Jacob the Monk was an 11th-century Ukrainian monk and author. He is known for an ode to Vladimir the Great in honor of his conversion of Kievan Rus to Christianity in 988, as well as a work on Boris and Gleb.

References

Monks of medieval Rus'
11th-century Rus' people